William Grant, Lord Prestongrange (1701 – 23 May 1764), was a Scottish politician and judge.

Grant was procurator for the Church of Scotland and Clerk to the General Assembly in 1731. He campaigned against patronage in the Church. He was appointed Solicitor General for Scotland in 1737 and promoted to Lord Advocate in 1746. He was Member of Parliament for Elgin Burghs from 1747 to 1754, and carried bills for the abolition of heritable jurisdictions, wardholding and for annexation of forfeited estates to the Crown. He was appointed a Lord of Session and Justiciary as Lord Prestongrange in 1754, and a Commissioner of annexed estates in 1755.

Biography
William Grant was the second son of Sir Francis Grant, Lord Cullen, by his second wife, Sarah, daughter of the Rev. Alexander Fordyce of Ayton, Berwickshire. He was admitted an advocate on 24 February 1722, and on 13 May 1731 was appointed Procurator to the General Assembly of the Church of Scotland, and principal clerk to the general assembly.

In 1736 Grant wrote a pamphlet Remarks on the State of the Church of Scotland with respect to Patronages, and with reference to a Bill now depending before Parliament, On 20 June 1737 he succeeded Charles Erskine of Tinwald as Solicitor General, and on 28 August in the following year was constituted one of the commissioners for improving the fisheries and manufactures of Scotland. Upon the retirement of Robert Craigie, Grant was appointed Lord Advocate on 26 February 1746, and on 20 May following the assembly held that the lord advocate could not act as procurator and clerk, and that consequently these offices were vacated.

At a by-election in February 1747 Grant was returned to parliament as member for the Elgin Burghs, and on 1 April 1747 was "added to the gentlemen who are appointed to prepare and bring in a bill for taking away and abolishing the heretable jurisdictions in … Scotland". Grant took part in the debate on the second reading of the bill, and is said by Horace Walpole to have spoken "excessively well for it". This important measure of Scottish reform was subsequently carried through both houses and passed, as well as another bill, which had been introduced by the lord advocate and the English law officers, for the abolition of ward holding.

At the general election in July 1747 Grant was again returned for the Elgin burghs, and in April 1749 supported the grant to the city of Glasgow for the losses sustained during the rebellion in a vigorous speech. On 24 February 1752 he introduced a bill for annexing the forfeited estates in Scotland to the crown inalienably, which after some opposition became law.

He was for the third time returned for the Elgin burghs at the general election in May 1754, but vacated his seat on his appointment as an ordinary lord of session and a Lord of Justiciary in the place of Patrick Grant, Lord Elchies. He took his seat on the bench on 14 November 1754, and assumed the title of Lord Prestongrange. In the following year he was appointed one of the commissioners for the annexed estates. Grant died at Bath on 23 May 1764, aged 63, and was buried on 7 June following in the aisle of Prestonpans Church, Haddingtonshire, where a monument in the churchyard was erected to his memory.

Works
Grant is said to have written The occasional Writer, containing an Answer to the second Manifesto of the Pretender's eldest Son, which bears date at the Palace of Holyrood House, 10 October 1745; containing Reflections, political and historical, upon the last Revolution, and the Progress of the present Rebellion in Scotland,' London, 1745, 8vo. The authorship of this pamphlet has, however, also been ascribed to Thomas Hollis.

Assessment
Tytler speaks highly of his integrity, candour, and "winning gentleness", and says that his "conduct in the adjustment of the claims on the forfeited estates merited universal approbation". With the exception of the proceedings at the trial of James Stewart in May 1752 (where as Lord Advocate he was chief prosecutor), Grant's conduct as public prosecutor was both fair and moderate.

Family
Grant married Grizel (died 1792), daughter of the Rev. – Millar. They had four daughters:
Janet, who married John, 4th Earl of Hyndford;
Agnes, who married Sir George Suttie, Baronet, of Balgone;
Jean, who married Robert Dundas of Arniston, the younger, the second lord president of that name; and
Christian, who died unmarried in 1761.

On the death of Janet, Countess of Hyndford in 1818, her nephew, Sir James Suttie, succeeded to the Preston-Grange estate (purchased by Grant in 1746), and assumed the additional surname of Grant.

Culture
Grant was the chief prosecutor of "James of the Glen" Stewart for aiding and abetting "The Appin Murder" – the May 1752 ambush and murder of Colin "The Red Fox" Campbell. This incident is described in Robert Louis Stevenson's novel Catriona where he appears as Lord Prestongrange.

Notes

References
 
Attribution
 Endnotes
Omond's Lord Advocates of Scotland (1883), ii. 28–58
Brunton and Haig's Senators of the College of Justice (1832), pp. 518–20
Allardyce's Scotland and Scotsmen (1888), i. 121-7
Anderson's Scottish Nation (1863), ii. 364
Burke's Peerage, &c. (1886), pp. 610–11. 1306
Foster's Members of Parliament of Scotland (1882), p. 162
Scots Mag. (1746), viii. 245-6 (1749), xi. 303 (1755), xvii. 212 (1764), xxvi. 291
Rogers's Monuments and Monumental Inscriptions in Scotland (1871), pp. 212–13
Official Return of Lists of members of parliament. pt. ii. pp. 96, 107, 121
Brit. Mus. Cat.

External links
Biography at the History of Parliament Online: 1715-1754
Biography at the History of Parliament Online: 1754-1790

Further reading

1701 births
1764 deaths
Members of the Parliament of Great Britain for Scottish constituencies
Prestongrange
Members of the Faculty of Advocates
Solicitors General for Scotland
Lord Advocates
Younger sons of baronets
British MPs 1741–1747
British MPs 1747–1754
British MPs 1754–1761